John C. Tidwell (born August 15, 1941) is an American politician and a former Democratic member of the Tennessee House of Representatives, representing District 74 from January 1997 until January 2015.

Education
Tidwell attended Castle Heights Military Academy (since closed) and earned his BS in civil engineering from the University of Tennessee.

Elections
1996 Tidwell was initially elected in the 1996 Democratic Primary and the November 5, 1996 General election.
1998 Tidwell was unopposed for the August 6, 1998 Democratic Primary, winning with 6,733 votes, and won the November 3, 1998 General election with 7,209 votes (58.7%) against Republican nominee Charles Musick.
2000 Tidwell was unopposed for both the August 3, 2000 Democratic Primary, winning with 3,773 votes, and the November 7, 2000 General election, winning with 14,468 votes.
2002 Tidwell was unopposed for the August 1, 2002 Democratic Primary, winning with 6,837 votes, and won the November 5, 2002 General election with 9,744 votes (61.4%) against Republican nominee Carl Hewitt.
2004 Tidwell was unopposed for both the August 5, 2004 Democratic Primary, winning with 3,094 votes, and the November 2, 2004 General election, winning with 14,979 votes.
2006 Tidwell was unopposed for both the August 3, 2006 Democratic Primary, winning with 7,257 votes, and the November 7, 2006 General election, winning with 13,871 votes.
2008 Tidwell was unopposed for both the August 7, 2008 Democratic Primary, winning with 2,543 votes (92.3%), and the November 4, 2008 General election, winning with 15,499 votes.
2010 Tidwell was unopposed for the August 5, 2010 Democratic Primary, and won the November 2, 2010 General election with 9,650 votes (99.2%) against two write-in candidates.
2012 Tidwell was unopposed for the August 2, 2012 Democratic Primary, winning with 2,884 votes, and won the November 6, 2012 General election with 9,356 votes (52.6%) against Republican nominee Lauri Day.
2014 Tidwell was unopposed in the primary election, and lost re-election to Republican Jay Reedy in the November general election with 4,987 votes (48%) to Reedy's 5,401 (52%).

References

External links
Official page at the Tennessee General Assembly

John Tidwell at Ballotpedia
John C. Tidwell at OpenSecrets

Place of birth missing (living people)
1941 births
Living people
Democratic Party members of the Tennessee House of Representatives
People from Humphreys County, Tennessee
University of Tennessee alumni